Dalva de Oliveira or Vicentina de Paula Oliveira (May 5, 1917 – August 31, 1972) was a Brazilian singer and one of "divas" of the "Radio Era." Her greatest hits included Segredo (Secret) (1947), Tudo acabado (It's All Over) (1950), Ave Maria (1950), and Teus olhos verdes (Your Green Eyes) (1961). In addition, she recorded frequently with her son Pery Ribeiro, from her marriage with composer Herivelto Martins. She died as a victim of internal bleeding, probably caused by cancer.

Life and career

Dalva was born in  Rio Claro, São Paulo, Brazil.  Her father was a carpenter and semi-professional musician, playing clarinet and saxophone with a group called Os Oito Batutas (the Eight Batons).  He died when Dalva was just eight years old, and, as a result, Dalva and her three sisters were placed into an orphanage, where Dalva remained for three years.  At the orphanage, Dalva learned to play piano and organ, as well as choral singing.  Dalva left the orphanage due to an illness, and went to live with her mother in the city of São Paulo.

In 1933, while still a teenager, Dalva began working as a singer, touring (together with her mother) with a group led by Antônio Zovetti.  Thereafter, Dalva spent a year as a regularly featured singer on Rádio Mineira in the state of Minas Gerais.  Hoping to achieve success on a larger stage, Dalva and her mother moved to Rio de Janeiro.  At first, Dalva had to work in a factory, while her mother worked as a cleaning woman.  In 1936, however, she was hired by Rádio Mayrink Veiga, the most powerful broadcaster in Rio at that time.

Dalva began working with Herivelto Martins and Francisco Sena, whose singing duo Preto e Branco (Black and White) was already popular.  In 1936, Dalva and Herivelto married.  The three renamed the group Trio de Ouro (Golden Trio).  The trio performed and recorded together until 1948.  In 1949, Dalva separated from Herivelto.  The couple's separation and divorce was prolonged, bitter, and public.  Their dispute and mutual accusations were featured not only in press coverage, but in the lyrics of songs recorded by each of them. When she left Herivelto, one part of the public viewed Dalva as a fallen woman; another part, as a rebel and hero.  Dalva was quoted as saying: "I had everything: a home, husband, children, career, and I left that security in order to gain my freedom, to regain myself as a woman."  Author Maria Hupfer wrote of her: "Dalva became the idol of the prostitutes, mistresses, and homosexuals, and was excoriated by housewives and family men."

Death
She died of internal bleeding because of cancer in her esophagus.

Selected filmography
 Berlin to the Samba Beat (1944)
 Snow White and the Seven Dwarfs (1937 film) (Brazilian dubbing) Snow White Speaking (1938)
 Pinocchio (1940 film) (Brazilian dubbing) The Blue Fairy (1940)
 Fun and Fancy Free (Brazilian dubbing) Singing Harp (1947)

See also 
 Dalva e Herivelto: uma Canção de Amor

References

External links
 Dalva´s Biography  at Collectors
 

1917 births
1972 deaths
People from Rio Claro, São Paulo
Brazilian contraltos
20th-century Brazilian women singers
20th-century Brazilian singers